Verchin is a commune in the Pas-de-Calais department in the Hauts-de-France region of France.

Geography
Verchin is located 20 miles (32 km) east of Montreuil-sur-Mer on the D93 road.

Population
The inhabitants are called Verchinois.

Places of interest
 The Château, dating from the sixteenth century
 The seventeenth century presbytery.
 The flamboyant gothic church of St. Omer, dating from the seventeenth century, with its twisted spire, caused by the use of unseasoned timber.

See also
 Communes of the Pas-de-Calais department

References

Communes of Pas-de-Calais